Mehen is a board game which was played in ancient Egypt. The game was named in reference to Mehen, a snake deity in ancient Egyptian religion.

History
Evidence of the game of Mehen is found from the Predynastic period dating from approximately 3000 BC and continues until the end of the Old Kingdom, around 2300 BC. Aside from physical boards, which mostly date to the Predynastic and Archaic periods, a Mehen board also appears in a picture in the tomb of Hesy-Ra, and its name first appears in the tomb of Rahotep. Other scenes dating to the Fifth Dynasty of Egypt and Sixth Dynasty of Egypt show people playing the game. No scenes or boards date to the Middle Kingdom of Egypt or New Kingdom of Egypt, and so it appears that the game was no longer played in Egypt after the Old Kingdom. It is, however, depicted in tombs of about 700, because the tomb decorations are copied from Old Kingdom originals.

Mehen also appears to have been played outside of Egypt. It appears alongside other boards displaying the game of senet at Bab 'edh Dhra and in Cyprus. In Cyprus, it sometimes appears on the opposite side of the same stone as senet, and those from Sotira Kaminoudhia, dating to approximately 2250 BC, are the oldest surviving double-sided boards known. Mehen survived in Cyprus longer than in Egypt, showing that the game was indigenized upon its adoption into the island's culture.

The rules and gameplay of Mehen are entirely unknown.

Equipment

In Egypt, the gameboard depicts a coiled snake whose body is divided into rectangular spaces. Several boards have been found with different numbers of segments, without distinguishing marks or ornamentation. In Cyprus and the Levant, the games take the form of a spiral of depressions, sometimes with the central or outer depressions differentiated by their larger size. These also display a variable number of depressions. The variability suggests that the number of segments was of little importance to the game. Objects associated with the board may or may not be playing pieces. From archaeological evidence, the game seemed to have been played with lion- or lioness-shaped pieces, in sets of three or as many as six, and a few small spheres (marbles or balls).

See also
Phaistos Disc
Senet
Hyena chase, North African race game using near identical equipment

References

Sources
 Piccione, Peter A. (1991). Mehen, Mysteries and Resurrection. pp. 43–52.
 Rothöhler, Benedikt (1997). Ägyptische Brettspiele außer Senet, unveröffentlichte MA-Thesis. Philosophische Fakultät I der Bayerischen Julius-Maximilians-Universität, Würzburg. pp. 10–23. pdf file
 Tyldesley, Joyce A. (2008). Egyptian Games and Sports (= Shire Egyptology, Band 29). Osprey Publishing. pp. 15–16. . 
 Tyldesley, Joyce A. (2010). The Penguin Book of Myths and Legends of Ancient Egypt. Penguin UK, Oxford. pp. 92–93. .

External links

Traditional board games
History of board games
Ancient Egyptian culture
African games
Egyptian inventions